Valentine (minor planet designation: 447 Valentine) is a large Main belt asteroid.

It was discovered by Max Wolf and A. Schwassmann on 27 October 1899 in Heidelberg.

References

External links
 
 

Background asteroids
Valentine
Valentine
Valentine
TD-type asteroids (Tholen)
18991027